Those Who Remain is a 2007 French drama film written and directed by Anne Le Ny, starring Vincent Lindon and Emmanuelle Devos.

Cast 
 Vincent Lindon as Bertrand Liévain
 Emmanuelle Devos as Lorraine Grégeois
 Yeelem Jappain as Valentine
 Anne Le Ny as Nathalie
 Grégoire Oestermann as Jean-Paul
 Christine Murillo as Suzy
 Ophélia Kolb as Jennifer
 Apolline Bouissières as Myriam
 Agathe Bouissières as Bénédicte
 Théo Frilet as Romain
 Pierre Gérard as Thierry

Reception 
Le Parisien gave the film four out of five stars and described it as sensitive and powerful.

Accolades

References

External links 
 

2007 films
2007 drama films
2000s French-language films
French drama films
StudioCanal films
Films directed by Anne Le Ny
2007 directorial debut films
Films about cancer in France
2000s French films